Omar Morales may refer to:

 Omar Morales (footballer, born 1985), footballer for the Saint Martin national team
 Omar Jesús Morales (born 1988), Bolivian football defender
 Omar Morales (fighter) (born 1985), Venezuelan mixed martial artist
 Omar Treviño Morales (born 1974), Mexican drug lord